11 is the seventh studio album from British funk band Sault, one of five released for free via digital distribution on 1 November 2022 (along with AIIR, Earth, Today & Tomorrow, and Untitled (God)). The download was available for only five days via a password-encrypted link and made as an offering to God. Four of the five (excluding Untitled (God)) were released on streaming music services on 12 November.

Critical reception
Writing for The Daily Telegraph, Ali Shutler reviewed all five simultaneous releases by Sault and gave them a collective four out of five stars, noting that 11 feels like a direct sequel to Nine, "pulling from Afrobeats and blues". In an overview of the best music of the week on All Songs Considered, NPR considers the five releases "as sonically diverse as they are ambitious in their breadth and scale". Damien Morris of The Observer reviewed all five albums and scored them five stars, noting that "anyone can find their own five-star classic among these 56 songs" and summing up that "it’s clear that these albums are an act of supreme generosity, not indulgent superfluity". Writing for Gigwise, Luke Winstanley called the collective releases "an absurd achievement" and scored this album seven out of 10, but noting that it "soon begins to sag".

Track listing
"Glory" – 5:37
"Fear No One" – 2:50
"Morning Sun" – 3:59
"Together" – 3:39
"Higher" – 3:41
"Jack's Gift" – 4:05
"Fight for Love" – 4:57
"Envious" – 2:33
"River" – 5:41
"In the Air" – 3:52
"The Circle" – 3:05

Charts
11 debuted on the UK Digital Albums chart from the Official Charts Company at 23. The same week, Earth was 21, Untitled (God) showed up at 23, and Today & Tomorrow was 26.

See also
List of 2022 albums

References

External links

Brief overview of the five albums from KEXP

2022 albums
Albums produced by Inflo
Sault (band) albums
Self-released albums
Albums free for download by copyright owner